Van der Laan is a Dutch toponymic surname meaning "from/of the lane". There are also a number of small settlements in the Netherlands specifically named "De Laan" that could be at a family's origin. Abroad the name is often written as VanderLaan or Vander Laan. People with this name include:

Arjan van der Laan (born 1969), Dutch former footballer and current manager
Cristoffel van der Laan (van der Laemen) (1607–1651), Flemish genre painter, son of Jacob
Eberhard van der Laan (1955-2017), Dutch lawyer and politician
Hans van der Laan (1904–1991), Dutch Benedictine monk and architect
Harry van der Laan (born 1964), Dutch footballer
Jacob van der Laan (van der Laemen) (1584–1624), Flemish painter, father of Christoffel
Jan van der Laan (1896–1966), Dutch architect
Jason Vander Laan (born 1992), American football player
Jeanet van der Laan (born 1980), Dutch footballer and politician
Keith VanderLaan, American (?) make-up artist
Leo van der Laan (1864–1942), Dutch architect
Lousewies van der Laan (born 1966), Dutch politician; member of the European Parliament 1999–2003
Mark van der Laan (born 1967), Dutch statistician
Martijn van der Laan (born 1988), Dutch footballer
Medy van der Laan (born 1968), Dutch politician
Nick VanderLaan (born 1979), American basketball player
Nico van der Laan (1908–1986), Dutch architect
Robert VanderLaan (1930–2015), American politician
Robin van der Laan (born 1968), Dutch footballer who played most of his career in England

See also
2823 van der Laan, main belt asteroid named after the Dutch astrologist Harry van der Laan
White Van der Laan, variant name of the Chasselas wine grape variety

References

Dutch-language surnames
Surnames of Dutch origin
Dutch toponymic surnames